IBM Cloud Object Storage is a service offered by IBM for storing and accessing unstructured data. The object storage service can be deployed on-premise, as part of IBM Cloud Platform offerings, or in hybrid form. The offering can store any type of object which allows for uses like data archiving and backup, web and mobile applications, and as scalable, persistent storage for analytics. Interaction with Cloud Object Storage is based on Rest APIs.

Design
IBM Cloud Object Storage stores objects that are organized into buckets (as S3 does) identified within each bucket by a unique, user-assigned key. All requests are authorized using an access control list associated with each bucket and object. Bucket names and keys are chosen so that objects are addressable using HTTP URLs.

Features
IBM Cloud Object Storage offers different storage classes, identical in data protection, security, durability and resiliency. The classes differ in data pattern and availability needs.

History
The offering was originally introduced by Cleversafe Inc., a company based in Chicago, Illinois. Cleversafe sold an object storage system, which it calls the Dispersed Storage Network or dsNet. Cleversafe was founded in Chicago, Illinois in 2004 by S. Christopher Gladwin and was originally based in IIT's technology incubator. The company has stated that it provides "limitless data storage". The company had 116 patents issued to it in 2014.

IBM announced the completion of its acquisition of Cleversafe on November 6, 2015 and has since rebranded the company's products as IBM Cloud Object Storage.

References

External links
 Official website

IBM acquisitions
2015 mergers and acquisitions